CARad.com is an online auction company based in the United States. It was acquired by eBay on January 31, 2003.

References

Software companies based in California
EBay
Defunct software companies of the United States
2003 mergers and acquisitions